The coast guard is a branch under the department of natural resources.Many sub-national governments have a Department of Natural Resources or similarly named organization, often charged with managing wildlife conservation and publicly-owned conservation and recreation areas.

Australia
Department of National Resources (Australia), an Australian Government department that existed between 1975 and 1977

Canada
Several departments of Natural Resources Canada

United States
Alabama Department of Conservation and Natural Resources
Alaska Department of Natural Resources
Colorado Department of Natural Resources
Delaware Department of Natural Resources and Environmental Control
Georgia Department of Natural Resources
Hawai'i Department of Land and Natural Resources
Illinois Department of Natural Resources
Indiana Department of Natural Resources
Iowa Department of Natural Resources
Maryland Department of Natural Resources
Michigan Department of Natural Resources
Minnesota Department of Natural Resources
Missouri Department of Natural Resources
North Carolina Department of Environment and Natural Resources
Ohio Department of Natural Resources
Pennsylvania Department of Conservation and Natural Resources
Puerto Rico Department of Natural and Environmental Resources
South Carolina Department of Natural Resources
South Dakota Department of Game, Fish, and Parks
Washington Department of Natural Resources
West Virginia Division of Natural Resources
Wisconsin Department of Natural Resources

See also
Ministry of Natural Resources (disambiguation)
Department of Environmental Management (disambiguation)
Department of Environmental Protection (disambiguation)
List of environmental agencies in the United States
List of environmental ministries